Illizi is a town and commune, coextensive with Illizi District, situated in the south-eastern part of Algeria, and capital of Illizi Province. According to the 2008 census it is the largest commune by population in the province, with a population of 17,252, up from 10,163 in 1998, and an annual population growth rate of 5.5%, the highest in the province. It is one of the gates to the Tassili N'Ajjer National Park with caves situated under the sands containing prehistoric drawings dating from 6000 years BC. There is a hotel and two camping sites, as well as many local tourist agencies.

Climate

Illizi has a hot desert climate (Köppen climate classification BWh), with long, extremely hot summers and short, very warm winters. The town is virtually rainless throughout the year as the average annual rainfall is around 10 mm (0.39 in), and summers are especially dry. The sky is always clear over Illizi all year long and the relative humidity is very low.

<div style="width:85%;">

Transport

Illizi lies on the N3 national highway, which leads north to In Amenas and Touggourt and south to Djanet.

The town is served by Takhamalt Airport, with flights to Ghardaïa and Ouargla.

Economy

The commune of Illizi includes five villages generating their own solar energy as part of a project to introduce solar energy to Algeria: Tihahiout, Ifni, Imehrou, Oued Semen, and Tamadjert.

Education

8.4% of the population has a tertiary education (the highest rate in the province), and another 15.7% has completed secondary education. The overall literacy rate is 78.1%, and is 85.2% among males and 69.0% among females.

Localities
The commune is composed of eight localities:

Centre Ville
Afara
Imehrou
Oued Semen
Aharhar
Tarat
Tamadjert
Fadnoune

See also

 Illizi Province

References

External links 
 www.fjexpeditions.com

Communes of Illizi Province
Tuareg
Province seats of Algeria
Illizi Province